Preston is a city in Franklin County, Idaho, United States. The population was 5,204 at the 2010 census.  The city is the county seat of Franklin County. It is part of the Logan, Utah-Idaho Metropolitan Statistical Area.

History

The Bear River Massacre occurred in 1863 at a point a few miles northwest of Preston.  The Bear River Massacre Site is a National Historic Landmark.

In 1866, Latter-day Saint pioneers arrived in the northern end of the Cache Valley, stretching across southeastern Idaho and northeastern Utah. They founded a community in that location and named it Worm Creek, but in 1881 changed it to Preston because leaders of the Church of Jesus Christ of Latter-day Saints (LDS Church) in Salt Lake City objected to the name "Worm Creek" being part of any church congregation's name. The name Preston was suggested by a local member to honor William B. Preston, who at the time was president of the LDS Church's Cache Stake.

It was not until the 1880s while William C. Parkinson was serving as the bishop of the Preston LDS Ward that a regular townsite was laid out.

Geography

Nearby is the Cub River Canyon, which is a popular recreation area.

Within Preston itself, U.S. Highway 91 is the main north-south street, State Street. By driving south on US-91, it is a 25-minute drive from Preston to the larger Logan, Utah. Oneida Street, also State Highway 36 is the primary west-east road. Preston is a half-hour drive from Interstate 15.

Climate
Preston has a warm-summer humid continental climate (Köppen climate classification: Dfb).

Demographics

2010 census
As of the census of 2010, there were 5,204 people, 1,751 households, and 1,327 families residing in the city. The racial makeup of the city was 93.7% White, 0.2% African American, 0.7% Native American, 0.2% Asian, 0.1% Pacific Islander, 3.3% from other races, and 1.7% from two or more races. Hispanic or Latino of any race were 7.5% of the population.

There were 1,751 households, of which 42.0% had children under the age of 18 living with them, 62.9% were married couples living together, 9.3% had a female householder with no husband present, 3.5% had a male householder with no wife present, and 24.2% were non-families. 21.3% of all households were made up of individuals, and 10.8% had someone living alone who was 65 years of age or older. The average household size was 2.92 and the average family size was 3.43.

The median age in the city was 31.7 years. 33.2% of residents were under the age of 18; 8.3% were between the ages of 18 and 24; 24.1% were from 25 to 44; 19.2% were from 45 to 64; and 15.2% were 65 years of age or older. The gender makeup of the city was 49.5% male and 50.5% female.

2000 census
As of the census of 2000, there were 4,682 people, 1,529 households, and 1,200 families residing in the city.

The racial makeup of the city was 95.22% White, 5.04% Hispanic or Latino, 0.09% African American, 0.45% Native American, 0.13% Asian, 0.06% Pacific Islander, 3.12% from other races, and 0.94% from two or more races.

There were 1,529 households, out of which 44.0% had children under the age of 18 living with them, 67.2% were married couples living together, 8.0% had a female householder with no husband present, and 21.5% were non-families. 20.0% of all households were made up of individuals, and 11.4% had someone living alone who was 65 years of age or older.  The average household size was 3.01 and the average family size was 3.50.

In the city, the population was spread out, with 35.3% under the age of 18, 10.5% from 18 to 24, 24.1% from 25 to 44, 15.9% from 45 to 64, and 14.3% who were 65 years of age or older.  The median age was 28 years. For every 100 females, there were 95.9 males.  For every 100 females age 18 and over, there were 90.2 males.

The median income for a household in the city was $35,204, and the median income for a family was $39,537. Males had a median income of $29,247 versus $20,652 for females. The per capita income for the city was $13,751.  About 5.9% of families and 6.7% of the population were below the poverty line, including 5.9% of those under age 18 and 6.2% of those age 65 or over.

Arts and culture

Festivals
For several years the city held a "Napoleon Dynamite Festival" in the summer. Many of the featured festival themes related to events occurring during the film. For example: Tetherball Tournament, Tater Tot Eating Contest, Moon Boot Dance, Impersonation, Look-A-Like Contest, Football Throwing Contest and more. In 2004 there was a single day event that drew approximately 300 people. Although this was not a large crowd, it did help raise $1,500 for the Preston School District Education Foundation. In 2005 an estimated 6,000 people attended the event, but that number dropped to an estimated 400 people in 2006. There are no plans for reviving the event.

The 2007 and 2008 event was held along with the 'That Famous Preston Night Rodeo' in Preston.  'That Famous Preston Night Rodeo' is usually held in late July, along with the Franklin County parade. The rodeo's name ('That Famous Preston Night Rodeo') comes from it being the first rodeo held during night time. It includes many events such as bull riding, barrel racing, and other popular events. The Franklin county parade includes floats and advertisements of local businesses. The rodeo and parade remain one of the town's most popular local events and traditions.

Festival of Lights 
Each year Preston holds the "Idaho Festival of Lights", which starts the day after Thanksgiving and goes until December 31.  The festival was started by two local business men (Wayne Bell and Walter Ross) along with many other community organizations to help celebrate Christmas within the community.  The festival consists of a lighted parade, fireworks, and displays in the city park.  The merchants along the main street of Preston have their store fronts decorated with Christmas lights during the festival.

A key event of the festival is the International Bed Race, which is held on the Saturday following Thanksgiving on the main street of Preston.  Additional events are a kids' parade and free movie.

Education

Preston School District operates public schools, including Preston High School.

Media
Much of the 2004 film Napoleon Dynamite was shot in the city of Preston, including at Preston High School, located several blocks from U.S. Highway 91. Several area landmarks can be seen throughout the film. Preston is the home of the film's creators, Jared and Jerusha Hess; Jared attended high school in Preston.

Notable people
Mervyn S. Bennion, Leonard C. Brostrom and Nathan K. Van Noy residents and former residents of Preston were awarded the Medal of Honor. All were members of the Church of Jesus Christ of Latter-day Saints. Three of five Latter-Day Saint World War II Medal of Honor recipients were from Preston.
 L. Edward Brown - politician and a general authority of The Church of Jesus Christ of Latter-day Saints.
 Ross T. Christensen - archeologist.
 Spencer J. Condie - a general authority of The Church of Jesus Christ of Latter-day Saints.
 Matthew Cowley - missionary; member of the Quorum of the Twelve Apostles in The Church of Jesus Christ of Latter-day Saints.
 Earl C. Crockett - economist; served as acting president of Brigham Young University.
 Richard F. Daines - Commissioner of the New York State Department of Health.
 Richard C. Edgley - a general authority of The Church of Jesus Christ of Latter-day Saints.
 R. E. Edlefsen - four term mayor of Boise, Idaho.
 Robert L. Geddes - 39th President pro tempore of the Idaho Senate.
 Jared and Jerusha Hess - husband-and-wife filmmakers known for their comedy films, particularly Napoleon Dynamite.
 Archie Johnson Inger - artist, author and religious lecturer.
 Harold B. Lee (1899-1973) - educator; president of The Church of Jesus Christ of Latter-Day Saints.

References

External links

 Official site

Cities in Idaho
County seats in Idaho
Cities in Franklin County, Idaho
Logan metropolitan area
Populated places established in 1866
1866 establishments in Idaho Territory